Mohd Ramdan bin Mohd Rosli (born 24 January 1996) is a Malaysian professional motorcycle racer. He races in the Asia Road Race SS600 Championship, aboard a Yamaha YZF-R6. He has previously competed in the FIM CEV Moto3 Junior World Championship and the FIM CEV Moto2 European Championship.

Career statistics

Grand Prix motorcycle racing

By season

Races by year

ARRC Supersports 600

Races by year
(key) (Races in bold indicate pole position; races in italics indicate fastest lap)

External links

Profile on GPUpdate.net

1996 births
Living people
Malaysian motorcycle racers
Moto2 World Championship riders
Moto3 World Championship riders